George Williams College is a campus of Aurora University located on Geneva Lake in Williams Bay, Wisconsin.

The campus was previously part of an independent college that was first based in the Hyde Park neighborhood of Chicago, Illinois, and later in Downers Grove, Illinois.

History

George Williams College has its genesis in a summer camp founded on the shores of Geneva Lake in Wisconsin by YMCA leaders I. E. Brown, William Lewis, and Robert Weidensall in 1886. This camp was created to serve as a professional YMCA training school. The camp moved to Hyde Park in 1890, where it transformed into a college. The school's Hyde Park campus went by a variety of names during the late-19th and early-20th century: the Training School of the YMCA (1890–96,) the Secretarial Institute and Training School (1896–1903), the Institute and Training School of the YMCA (1903–13), and the YMCA College or Association College (1913–33). In 1933, its name was changed for the final time to "George Williams College". During the 20th century, the college "was a national center for the development of group work as a profession. It was also an early pioneer in the idea of holistic health, with the integration of body, mind and spirit that was key concept within the YMCA movement."

By late 1965, the college had moved to Downers Grove, Illinois, but the stark racial divide between the mostly-black student body and the mostly-white residents of Downers Grove caused racial issues to flare up numerous times. By the 1980s, the school was struggling. In 1986, the college library was acquired by The Master's University in Santa Clarita, California, and in 1989, the abandoned Hyde Park campus was demolished to make room for new development opportunities.

The college was absorbed by Aurora University in 2000. The original Geneva Lake camp location now houses a campus of the college, which is named "George Williams College".

Present

The GWC campus now consists of 137 acres. The campus hosts a conference center and the Music by the Lake summer concert series at Ferro Pavilion. GWC focuses on service-related undergraduate degree programs, including business management, environmental studies and sustainability, nursing, psychology, and social work.

References 

Aurora University
Defunct private universities and colleges in Illinois
Educational institutions established in 1890
Educational institutions disestablished in 2000
Hyde Park, Chicago
Universities and colleges founded by the YMCA
Universities and colleges in Chicago
1890 establishments in Illinois
2000 disestablishments in Illinois